Ruth Anna Buffalo is an American politician who served as a member of the North Dakota House of Representatives from the 27th District, serving from December 1, 2018. She is the first Native American Democratic woman elected to the North Dakota Legislature.

Early life and education 
Buffalo was born in Watford City, North Dakota and raised in Mandaree, North Dakota. She is an enrolled citizen of the Mandan, Hidatsa, and Arikara Nation. She earned a Bachelor of Science degree in criminal justice from Si Tanka University and three master's degrees from North Dakota State University: one in management, another in business administration, and one in public health.

Career 
Her involvement in politics began when she ran for North Dakota Insurance Commissioner in the 2016 North Dakota elections, but lost to Jon Godfread. In April 2017, she became party secretary of the North Dakota Democratic–Nonpartisan League and in July 2017, her mayor appointed her to the Fargo Native American Commission.

North Dakota House of Representatives 
She replaced Randy Boehning, who was the primary sponsor of the Voter ID law that voting rights advocates warned would disenfranchise Native American voters. Other important issues in this 2018 race included access to health care, education (both K-12 and higher education), property taxes, and community safety.

See also
List of Democratic Socialists of America who have held office in the United States

References

External links
Ruth Buffalo Biography in the North Dakota Legislative Assembly
Ruth Buffalo's Candidate Page

Native American state legislators
Democratic Socialists of America politicians from North Dakota
21st-century American politicians
Year of birth missing (living people)
Living people
21st-century American women politicians
Women state legislators in North Dakota
People from McKenzie County, North Dakota
North Dakota State University alumni
Candidates in the 2016 United States elections
20th-century Native American women
20th-century Native Americans
21st-century Native American women
21st-century Native Americans
Democratic Party members of the North Dakota House of Representatives